Hermund Nygård (born 16 May 1979 in Råde, Norway) is a Norwegian jazz musician (drums) and composer residing in Oslo, known from collaborations with musicians like Hallgeir Pedersen, Staffan William-Olsson, Anders Aarum, Steinar Raknes, Erlend Slettevoll, Magne Thormodsæter, Karin Krog, Bob Dorough and Bobby Shew, and bands like The Real Thing and Sharp9.

Career 
Nygård is a graduate of the Jazz program at Trondheim Musikkonservatorium (2005), where he started his own Billington Trio including fellow students Ove Alexander Billington (piano) and Andreas Amundsen (double bass). He has participated in the bands Hubtones, In Front, Platoon, Stjern and Schap9. He is one of the most popular jazz drummers in Norway, who made his mark in many genres. Having worked with numerous artists both in Norway and internationally. He has collaborated on several occasions in the twice Grammy nominated band Sharp 9 Hermund has also worked as an arranger and musical director, among others, with Yngvar Numme, and in the TV show Senkveld with the duo Thomas & Harald.

With his own Hermund Nygård Quintet including with Knut Riisnæs (saxophone), Kevin Dean (trumpet), Anders Aarum (piano) and Audun Ellingsen (bass) gave a concert on 'Herr Nilsen' in 2013.

Discography 

2004: I Fall in Love Too Easily (Liphone), with Grethe J. Kruse
2009: Stompin' Feet (Sweet Recordings), with Julie Dahle Aagård
2013: Tranquil Fjord (NorCD), with Audun Ellingsen & Gisle Torvik

References 

1979 births
Living people
Musicians from Råde
Norwegian University of Science and Technology alumni
20th-century Norwegian drummers
21st-century Norwegian drummers
Norwegian jazz drummers
Male drummers
Norwegian jazz composers
20th-century drummers
Male jazz composers
20th-century Norwegian male musicians
21st-century Norwegian male musicians